Huete may refer to:

People
 Félix Huete (1914–2000), Spanish football player
 Luis Huete (born 1956), Spanish professor
 Pepito Ramos Huete (born 1951), Spanish football player

Places
 Huete, Spain
 Punta Huete Airport, Nicaragua

Other
 Battle of Huete